Osvaldoa is a monotypic genus of flowering plants belonging to the family Poaceae. The only species is Osvaldoa valida.

Its native range is Southern Brazil to Northeastern Argentina.

References

Poaceae
Monotypic Poaceae genera